Backyard Ashes is a 2013 Australian comedy film about backyard cricket.

Cast
 Andrew S. Gilbert as Dougie Waters
 Felix Williamson as Edward Lords
 Rebecca Massey as Lilly Waters
 Damian Callinan as Spock
 John Wood as Merv
 Waseem Khan as Bin
 Shingo Usami as Taka
 Jamie Way as Shep
 Stephen Holt as Norm
 Norah George as Grace
 Lex Marinos as Mac
 Maddison Smith-Catlin	as Kerri
 Jake Speer as Pigeon
 Zenia Starr as Nehru    
 Michael Morley as Young Cricket Supporter

Production
Backyard Ashes was shot in the town of Wagga Wagga, New South Wales, the first of two films to be shot in the town (the other being Stakes).

Reception
Film critic Paul Byrnes wrote in The Sydney Morning Herald: "Grentell has good timing and an inventive, unpredictable eye for a gag. He has a feel for the dryness of Australian humour, without the jingoism." The film earned a profit and  grossed over $100,000 in just four cinemas in its first month. It went on to screen on more than 70 screens nationally, grossing over $600,000, and continues to pay small royalties.

References

External links

Official website
Review of film at Sydney Morning Herald
Review of film at Urban Cinefile

Australian comedy films
2013 films
2013 comedy films
Cricket films
2010s English-language films
Films set in New South Wales
2013 directorial debut films
Films about cats
2010s Australian films